"Shooter" is the third single from Lil Wayne's fifth studio album Tha Carter II  being also the second single on Robin Thicke's second studio album The Evolution of Robin Thicke. The song was also featured on the Like Father, Like Son bonus disc. The song samples the electric piano from Vic Juris’ "Horizon Drive,". It is a remake of Robin Thicke's "Oh Shooter", from his first album A Beautiful World, which was inspired by Thicke's real-life experience of being caught in a bank robbery when he was 18.

Music video
Directed by Benny Boom, the video is an interpretation of the 1986 Run-DMC video "Walk This Way", with Thicke and Wayne in neighboring apartments representing R&B and Dirty South respectively. The video shows both artists' different lifestyles as they begin to overlap each other, culminating in both artists performing onstage.

In popular culture
It was featured in the 2008 film Rambo.

Charts

References

2005 songs
2006 singles
Cash Money Records singles
Lil Wayne songs
Robin Thicke songs
Music videos directed by Benny Boom
Songs written by Lil Wayne
Songs written by Robin Thicke